Drosera paleacea is a species of pygmy sundew from Western Australia.

Carnivorous plants of Australia
paleacea
Caryophyllales of Australia